Pyripora is a genus of bryozoans belonging to the family Electridae.

The genus has almost cosmopolitan distribution.

Species:
 Pyripora brevicauda Canu & Bassler, 1923 
 Pyripora catenularia (Fleming, 1828)

References

Cheilostomatida